Nicolas-Jean-Baptiste Raguenet (1715 – 17 April 1793) was a French painter born in Gentilly.

He was the son of Jean-Baptiste Raguenet (1682–1755), actor and painter, and Genevieve Murgues. The Raguenets, father and son, put together a veritable portrait of Paris with their many paintings depicting buildings and landscapes in the city.

A master painter trained at the Académie de Saint-Luc, he was responsible for many "View of Paris" paintings, notably of the Seine, with an almost photographic precision, which adds a historical interest to his works in addition to their artistic value. Many of his works were acquired by the Carnavalet Museum in 1882.

His known paintings include:

Vue de l’Archevêché (1750)
L’Hôtel de Ville et la place de Grève (1751)
Le cabaret à l’Image Notre-Dame, sur la place de Grève (1751)
Maisons du cloître Notre-Dame, donnant sur la rivière (1753)
La joute des mariniers, entre le pont Notre-Dame et le Pont-au-Change (1756)
Vue des hauteurs de Chaillot (1757)
Le Palais des Tuileries (1757, in the Carnavalet Museum)
Le Pont-Neuf et le quai des Orfèvres (1759)
Le Louvre et le Pont Neuf (1760)
Vue de la Seine à Ivry (vers 1760)
Le château de Menars (1762 - commissioned by Madame de Pompadour)
L’Incendie de l’Hôtel-Dieu (1772)
Le Pont Neuf et la Samaritaine (1777)
L’Ile Saint-Louis
L’Hôtel Bretouvilliers
L’Arsenal
L’Ile Louviers
Le Quai de la Salpétrière (Vue des bords de la Seine aux environs de la Salpétrière)
Le Village de Chaillot
Vue du Pont-Neuf avec la Samaritaine

References 

 "Raguenet, Nicolas and Jean Baptiste (Father and Son)", Benezit Dictionary of Artists, Oxford Art Online.

External links 
 

18th-century French painters
French male painters
1715 births
1793 deaths
18th-century French male artists